The Lord of the Rings: The War of the Rohirrim is an upcoming 2D traditional animated fantasy film directed by Kenji Kamiyama from a screenplay by Phoebe Gittins and Arty Papageorgiou, based on the novel The Lord of the Rings by J. R. R. Tolkien. Produced by New Line Cinema and Warner Bros. Animation and with 2D traditionally animated production by Sola Entertainment, The War of the Rohirrim is the seventh film in the audiovisual canon of Middle-earth established by Peter Jackson, following the live-action The Lord of the Rings and The Hobbit film trilogies. A prequel set 183 years before the events depicted in The Lord of the Rings: The Two Towers (2002), the film stars Brian Cox as Helm Hammerhand, a legendary King of Rohan. Also starring is Miranda Otto, reprising her role as Éowyn from the live-action The Lord of the Rings film trilogy.

Development of the film was being fast-tracked by June 2021, when it was officially announced along with the involvement of Kamiyama, consultant Philippa Boyens who co-wrote the Lord of the Rings film trilogy, and initial writers Jeffrey Addiss and Will Matthews. Animation work had begun by then, taking visual inspiration from those films. Gittins and Papageorgiou were working on the script by February 2022.

The Lord of the Rings: The War of the Rohirrim will be released by Warner Bros. Pictures on April 12, 2024.

Premise
Set 183 years before the events of The Lord of the Rings: The Two Towers, The War of the Rohirrim tells the story of Helm Hammerhand, a legendary King of Rohan who must defend against an army of Dunlendings. He becomes the namesake for the stronghold of Helm's Deep.

Cast
 Brian Cox as Helm Hammerhand: the King of Rohan.
 Miranda Otto as Éowyn: a future shieldmaiden of Rohan who narrates the film. Otto reprises her role from Peter Jackson's The Lord of the Rings film series (2001–2003).
 Gaia Wise as Hera: the daughter of Helm who helps defend their people.
 Luke Pasqualino as Wulf: the ruthless leader of the Dunlendings who seeks revenge against Rohan for the death of his father.
 Laurence Ubong Williams as Fréaláf Hildeson: Helm's nephew and successor to the throne of Rohan.
 Shaun Dooley as Freca: Wulf's father, a Dunlending lord.

Lorraine Ashbourne, Yazdan Qafouri, Benjamin Wainwright, Michael Wildman, Jude Akuwudike, Bilal Hasna, and Janine Duvitski have been cast in undisclosed roles.

Production

Development
During 20th anniversary celebrations for the release of the film The Lord of the Rings: The Fellowship of the Ring (2001), film studio New Line Cinema announced in June 2021 that it was fast-tracking development of an anime prequel film with Warner Bros. Animation. Titled The Lord of the Rings: The War of the Rohirrim, the film is set 183 years before the events of The Lord of the Rings: The Two Towers (2002) and tells the story of Helm Hammerhand, who is explored in the appendices of J. R. R. Tolkien's The Lord of the Rings novel and is the namesake for the fortress Helm's Deep seen in The Two Towers. Kenji Kamiyama and Joseph Chou were set to direct and produce the film, respectively, after doing the same for Warner Bros.' anime television series Blade Runner: Black Lotus, with Jeffrey Addiss and Will Matthews writing the screenplay. The film was intended to be connected to the narrative of the film trilogy, with the trilogy's co-writer, Philippa Boyens, consulting on the prequel. The trilogy's director, Peter Jackson, and other co-writer, Fran Walsh, were not involved with the project.

By February 2022, the script was being written by Phoebe Gittins, Boyens' daughter, and her writing partner Arty Papageorgiou, based on a story by Addiss and Matthews. Richard Taylor, the creative director of special effects company Wētā Workshop, and illustrators Alan Lee and John Howe also joined the film's creative team after all working on the live-action trilogy.

Casting
Voice casting for the film had begun by the time of its announcement in June 2021, and announcements were expected soon after February 2022. In June, Brian Cox was revealed to be voicing Helm, with Miranda Otto reprising her role of Éowyn from the live-action films to serve as the narrator. Also revealed to be cast in the film were Gaia Wise, Luke Pasqualino, Lorraine Ashbourne, Yazdan Qafouri, Benjamin Wainwright, Laurence Ubong Williams, Shaun Dooley, Michael Wildman, Jude Akuwudike, Bilal Hasna, and Janine Duvitski.

Animation
Sola Entertainment had begun work on the animation for the film by the time of its announcement in June 2021. The film draws visual inspiration from the Lord of the Rings film trilogy.

Marketing
A first look at concept art from the film, showing the influence of the live-action trilogy on its visuals, was revealed in February 2022.

Release
The Lord of the Rings: The War of the Rohirrim will be released on April 12, 2024, by Warner Bros. Pictures.

References

External links
 

2024 animated films
War of the Rohirrim
American animated fantasy films
Japanese animated fantasy films
Anime-influenced animation
Anime-influenced Western animation
Upcoming films
Animated films based on British novels
Animated war films
New Line Cinema animated films
Warner Bros. Animation animated films
2020s American films
2020s British films
American prequel films
Japanese prequel films